Dijana Dejanović (born 17 July 1979) is a Serbian model, and actress known for her works in Bollywood and European cinema. Dejanović is a noted model, and has modeled for several international brands such as The Telegraph-t2. She made her Hindi cinema debut with Main Aur Charles (2015).

Filmography

References

External links
 

Living people
1983 births
People from Banja Luka
Serbian film actresses
Serbian female models
Serbian expatriates in India
Actresses in Hindi cinema
Actresses in Bengali cinema
European actresses in India
Actresses of European descent in Indian films
21st-century Serbian actresses